Anna Rose (born August 6 ), also known by the name Menaga Miss, is an American pop rock singer, songwriter and actress''.

Career
Anna Rose has opened for the Pointer Sisters, has been featured in FHM magazine on-line and its international counterparts, and has been nominated for a Hollywood Music in Media Award for best pop song, "Hard Driving Me Crazy".

Discography

Albums

Singles

Awards and nominations

References

External links

American women singer-songwriters
American stage actresses
Living people
Musicians from Ann Arbor, Michigan
Actresses from Michigan
21st-century American actresses
21st-century American singers
Actors from Ann Arbor, Michigan
Year of birth missing (living people)
21st-century American women singers
Singer-songwriters from Michigan